Submechanophobia (and  and φόβος (phóbos) 'fear') is a fear of submerged human-made objects, either partially or entirely underwater. These objects could be shipwrecks, statues, animatronics as seen in theme parks, or old buildings, but also more mundane items such as buoys and miscellaneous debris.

Causes 
While a fear of water (aquaphobia) or a fear of sharks (galeophobia) are rational fears (hence, "phobia") that can be linked to understandable reasons, submechanophobia can be triggered by harmless objects which cannot reasonably cause harm to the sufferer. Many submechanophobics do not attribute the development of their phobia to any specific experience or traumatic memory—in fact, most claim that their symptoms arose after a lifetime of contact with their triggers. There are several proposed causes of submechanophobia, though none are proven. Submechanophobia could be caused by a fear of the unknown, and the common terror of not knowing what lies beneath the waterline. Objects could be visually distorted by water and its movement, which could make them seem alive, and thus, possibly harmful. However, submechanophobia, by definition, only concerns artificial, human-made creations—not living creatures. A suggested explanation is that the human mind instinctively detects a foreign object in an otherwise natural environment, and this triggers a fight-or-flight response, as humans respond negatively to that which is outside of the norm.

Criteria 
To qualify for a diagnosis of a specific phobia such as submechanophobia, subjects must display several symptoms and fulfill a list of requirements.

 Unreasonable and excessive fear 
 Immediate anxiety response
 Avoidance/extreme distress 
 Life-limiting
 6+ month duration of fear
 Not attributable to another disorder

Symptoms 
Many individuals afflicted with submechanophobia exhibit some symptoms in common.

 Severe anxiety associated with the thought of submerged human-made objects 
 Muscle tension, body aches
 Breathlessness, sensations of choking
 Increased blood pressure
 Sweating, nausea
 Dizziness, feeling faint
 Inability to concentrate
 Avoidance of locations where contact is likely to be made with triggers

Treatment 
Treatment of a fear of artificial submerged objects generally involves identifying and eliminating the underlying fears. A patient can undergo therapy should they believe that their condition is out of control, and interfering with their everyday life. Treatment plans may include cognitive behavioral therapy, virtual reality therapy, exposure therapy, or a combination of these. A sufferer's needs will be unique to themselves, as well as to the nature of their affliction.

See also

 List of phobias
 Thalassophobia – fear of the sea

References

Further reading
 
 

Phobias
Water